Elantxobe is a town and municipality located in the province of Biscay, in the autonomous community of Basque Country, northern Spain.

Cityscape

References

External links
ELANTXOBE in the Bernardo Estornés Lasa - Auñamendi Encyclopedia (Euskomedia Fundazioa) 

Municipalities in Biscay
Fishing communities
Populated coastal places in Spain